Back Bay National Wildlife Refuge in southeastern Virginia is located in the independent city of Virginia Beach. Established in 1938 in an isolated portion of the former Princess Anne County, it is managed by the U.S. Fish & Wildlife Service.  The administrative office is located on Sandbridge Road at Sigma between Lago Mar and Sandbridge Beach.  The Visitor Contact Center is accessed via Sandpiper Road from the Sandbridge area of Virginia Beach, which is the southernmost area of development on the Atlantic Coast of Virginia.

Most of the  fresh water refuge is on the Currituck Banks Peninsula, which borders the Atlantic Ocean on the east and the Back Bay of the Currituck Sound on the west. As part of Virginia's Outer Banks, the refuge's barrier islands feature large sand dunes, maritime forests, fresh water marshes, ponds, ocean beach, and large impoundments for wintering wildfowl. The majority of refuge marshlands are on islands contained within the waters of Back Bay. It is considered by conservationists to be an important link along the Atlantic Flyway for migratory birds such as snow geese.

The refuge adjoins Virginia's False Cape State Park.  Beyond that, the northern edge of North Carolina's Outer Banks lies immediately to the south. A tram runs through the refuge, providing the only public access to False Cape State Park other than by foot, bicycle or boat.  A bicycle/pedestrian trail is planned through the refuge between Sandbridge and Lago Mar.

Gallery

References

External links 
 U.S. Fish & Wildlife Service: Back Bay National Wildlife Refuge
 U.S. Fish & Wildlife Service: Refuge brochure (archived)
 U.S. Fish & Wildlife Service: Refuge brochure
 Back Bay Restoration Foundation homepage

National Wildlife Refuges in Virginia
Wetlands of Virginia
Protected areas of Virginia Beach, Virginia
Protected areas established in 1938
1938 establishments in Virginia
Landforms of Virginia Beach, Virginia